The 2005 Malaysia Premier League, also known as the TM Liga Premier for sponsorship reasons, is the second season of the Malaysia Premier League, the second-tier professional football league in Malaysia. The season was held from 6 February and concluded on 23 July 2005. 

The Malaysia Premier League champions for 2005 was Selangor which beaten Negeri Sembilan during the final with a score of 4–2. Both clubs were promoted to Super League.

Due to exclusion of Public Bank who was relegated from 2005 Malaysia Super League and MK Land, who were suspended for five years from all competitions due to pulling out of the Malaysian League, the relegations of Melaka and PDRM were revoked and both teams remained in the 2005–06 Malaysia Premier League. For the next season, the Football Association of Brunei entered a club team, DPMM, rather than the squad from national team, the Brunei.

Team

Changes from last season
Promoted to the Super League
 MPPJ
 TM Melaka

Relegated from the Super League
 Sarawak
 Kedah

Promoted from the FAM League
 Suria Nibong Tebal
 UPB Jendarata

Relegated to the FAM League
 Kelantan
 JPS

League table

Group A

Group B

Final

Goalscorers

References

See also
 2005 Malaysia Super League

Malaysia Premier League seasons
2
Malaysia
Malaysia